Vacuolar protein sorting 26 homolog B (S. pombe) is a protein in humans that is encoded by the VPS26B gene.

References

Further reading